This is a partial list of companies that have published roleplaying games under the provisions of the Open Game License (OGL) issued by Wizards of the Coast.

 Alderac Entertainment Group/Crafty Games, Spycraft 2.0
 Amarillo Design Bureau, Inc., "Prime Directive d20", "Prime Directive PD20 Modern"
 Bards and Sages, Neiyar: Land of Heaven and the Abyss, Koboldnomicon
 Editora JBC, Defensores de Tóquio - Manual 4D&T
 Evil Hat Productions,  Fate, Spirit of the Century,  The Dresden Files RPG
 Green Ronin Publishing, True20 Adventure Roleplaying Game, Mutants & Masterminds Roleplaying Game
 Mongoose Publishing, OGL Ancients, OGL CyberNet: Cyberpunk Roleplaying, OGL Horror, OGL Manga, OGL Steampunk, OGL Wild West
 Necrotic Gnome, Old School Essentials, 
 Paizo Publishing, Pathfinder Roleplaying Game, Starfinder Roleplaying Game
 Pinnacle Entertainment, Pathfinder for Savage Worlds.
 Shewstone Publishing LLC, Magonomia, the RPG of Renaissance wizardry
 Skirmisher Publishing LLC, Nuisances 
 Spica Publishing, third party publishers of products for the current edition of the Traveller SF RPG.

References

Lists about role-playing games
Lists of companies by industry